Ashton (1806 – after 1828) was a British Thoroughbred racehorse and sire best known for winning the classic St Leger Stakes in 1809. He was undefeated in three races as a three-year-old in 1809, culminating with his classic victory at Doncaster. After missing the whole of the 1810 season he won a Great Subscription Purse at York on his reappearance as a five-year-old but was beaten in his three remaining races. He was then retired to stud, where he had no success as a sire of winners.

Background
Ashton was a bay horse standing 15.2 hands high bred by his owner Archibald Hamilton, 9th Duke of Hamilton and was the sixth of the Duke's seven St Leger winners. He was described by his owners as "a horse of great bone and strength... with true shape and corresponding action". Henry Hall Dixon was less flattering, describing Ashton as "a hunter-looking horse with very hairy legs".

Ashton was sired by either Walnut or Serpent, meaning that his dam was covered by two stallions in the year of his conception. Walnut, a son of Highflyer, never raced after an accident which left him with a "wasted" foreleg. He sired several other good horses including Constantia, the dam of the St Leger winner Ebor. Serpent, a son of Eclipse, sired no other horses of consequence. Ashton's dam Miss Haworth was a member of Thoroughbred family 29 and therefore closely related to several notable horses including Rowton and  Landscape.

Racing career

1809: three-year-old season
Ashton was unraced as a two-year-old and made his racecourse debut on 30 May 1809 at York Racecourse. He started the 6/5 favourite for a sweepstakes over one and three quarter miles and won "very easy" from Lord Fitzwilliam's colt Whitenose. In summer he ran a trial race against the stable's 1808 St Leger winner Petronius and finished level with the older horse despite receiving only seven pounds- considerably less than weight-for-age.

After a break of almost four months, Ashton reappeared to contest the thirty-fourth running of the St Leger at Doncaster Racecourse. In a field of fourteen runners he was made the 15/8 favourite ahead of Cervantes on 6/1 and Middlethorpe (also owned by the Duke of Hamilton) on 8/1. Ridden by Ben Smith, he disputed the lead from the start and won the classic easily from Middlethorpe, with Henry Peirse's filly Lisette in third. Two days later Ashton contested the Doncaster Stakes over four miles. Carrying only 84 pounds, he started at odds of 1/4 and completed an unbeaten season by winning from Mr Duncombe's four-year-old filly Ceres.

1811: five-year-old season
Ashton missed the whole of the 1810 before returning as a five-year-old at York on 21 August 1811. He started favourite for the five-year-olds' division of the Great Subscription Purse and won from Cervantes, his only opponent. On the following day, he ran in another division of the Great Subscription Purse and started favourite against two six-year-old rivals. He suffered his first defeat as he finished second to the Duke of Leeds' horse Mowbray.

In the following month, Ashton returned to Doncaster's St Leger meeting where he finished second in the one and a half mile Fitzwilliam Stakes behind Mr Garforth's two-year-old [sic] colt by Camillus (later named Oiseau), with the 1810 St Leger winner Octavian in fourth place. Three days later, he was defeated by Octavian in a four mile sweepstakes at the same course, conceding ten pounds to the younger classic winner.

Stud career
Ashton began his stud career at King's Farm, Woodford Wells at a fee of ten guineas. By 1822, he was standing at Michael Grove near Arundel, Sussex at a fee of 8 guineas. In 1823 his fee was reduced to 5 guineas and he was first moved to Mr. Haynes' Livery Stables in Great Portland Street and by 1826 was relocated to Chiselden near Swindon, Wiltshire. He was advertised at the Chiselden location in 1829 but is not mentioned in the 1830 stallion register.

Pedigree

Ashton was inbred 2 x 3 to Highflyer, meaning that this stallion appears in both the third generation of his pedigree. He was also inbred 3 x 4 x 4 to Herod.

References

1806 racehorse births
Racehorses bred in the United Kingdom
Racehorses trained in the United Kingdom
Thoroughbred family 29
Byerley Turk sire line
St Leger winners